Within the South-West Indian Ocean, the term tropical cyclone is reserved for those systems, that have winds of at least . It is the third-highest classification used within the South-West Indian Ocean to classify tropical cyclones with.

Background
The South-West Indian Ocean tropical cyclone basin is located to the south of the Equator between Africa and 90°E. The basin is officially monitored by Météo-France who run the Regional Specialised  Meteorological Centre in La Réunion, while other meteorological services such as the Australian Bureau of Meteorology, Mauritius Meteorological Service as well as the United States Joint Typhoon Warning Center also monitor the basin.

Systems

|-
| Marcelle ||  ||  ||  || South-Western Australia ||  ||  ||
|-
| Bernadette ||  ||  ||  || None ||  ||  ||
|-
| Robyn-Deborah ||  ||  ||  || Madagascar || || ||
|-
| Barbara ||  ||  ||  || None ||  ||  ||
|-
| Naomi ||  ||  ||  || None ||  ||  ||
|-
| Oscar ||  ||  ||  || None ||  ||  ||
|-
| Konita ||  ||  ||  || None ||  ||  ||
|-
| Kesiny ||  ||  ||  || Madagascar ||  Unknown  ||  ||
|-
| Manou ||  ||  ||  || Madagascar ||  Unknown || 89  ||
|-
|  ||  ||  ||  || No land areas ||  || 
|-
|  ||  ||  ||  || Réunion, Mauritius || None || None ||
|-
| Dineo ||  ||  ||  || Mozambique, South Africa, Zimbabwe, Botswana, Malawi ||  ||  ||
|-
|  ||   ||  ||  || Madagascar ||  ||  || 
|-
|  ||  ||  ||  || No land areas ||  ||  ||
|-
|  ||  ||  ||  || Madagascar, Réunion, Mauritius ||  ||  || 
|-
| Savannah ||  ||  ||  || No land areas ||  ||  ||
|-
| Lorna ||  ||  ||  || No land areas ||  ||  ||
|-
| Belna ||  ||  ||  || Seychelles, Mayotte, Comoros, Madagascar ||  ||  ||
|-
| Calvinia ||  ||  ||  || Mauritius, Rodrigues ||  ||  ||
|-
| Gabekile ||  ||  ||  || No land areas ||  ||  || 
|-
| Alicia ||   ||  ||  || No land areas ||  ||  ||
|-
| Eloise ||   ||  ||  || Madagascar, Mozambique, Malawi, Zimbabwe, South Africa, Eswatini ||  ||  ||
|-
| Guambe ||   ||  ||  || Madagascar, Mozambique, South Africa, Eswatini ||  ||  ||
|-
| Marian ||   ||  ||  || None ||  ||  ||
|-
| Jobo ||   ||  ||  || Seychelles, Madagascar, Tanzania || Unknown ||  ||
|-
| Cheneso ||   ||  ||  || Madagascar || Unknown ||  ||
|-
| Dingani ||   ||  ||  || None || None || None ||
|-
| Enala ||   ||  ||  || None || None || None ||
|}

Climatology

See also
South-West Indian Ocean tropical cyclone

Notes

References

Tropical cyclones by basin